Alia Advani (born 31 July 1991), known professionally as Kiara Advani, is an Indian actress who works in Hindi and Telugu language films. After making her acting debut in the comedy film Fugly (2014), she played  MS Dhoni's wife in the sports biopic M.S. Dhoni: The Untold Story (2016). She gained praise for playing a sexually unsatisfied wife in the Netflix anthology film Lust Stories (2018) and played the leading lady in the political thriller Bharat Ane Nenu (2018).

Advani received wider attention for starring in the romantic drama Kabir Singh and the comedy drama Good Newwz, two of the highest-grossing Hindi films of 2019. She won the IIFA Award for Best Supporting Actress for the latter. This success continued with her roles in the 2021 film Shershaah, for which she was nominated for the Filmfare Award for Best Actress, and the 2022 films Bhool Bhulaiyaa 2 and Jugjugg Jeeyo. Advani is married to actor Sidharth Malhotra.

Early life 
Advani was born to Jagdeep Advani, a Sindhi Hindu businessman and Genevieve Jaffrey, a teacher whose father was originally from Lucknow and whose mother was of Scottish, Irish, Portuguese, and Spanish ancestry. Her brother, Mishaal, is a musician. She is related to several celebrities through her maternal family. Actors Ashok Kumar and Saeed Jaffrey are her step-great-grandfather and great-uncle, respectively.

Advani attended the Cathedral and John Connon School, and later attended Jai Hind College where she graduated with a Bachelor of Arts degree in mass communications.

Born as Alia Advani, she changed her first name to Kiara prior to the release of her first film, Fugly, in 2014. Her choice of the name was inspired from Priyanka Chopra's character Kiara in the film Anjaana Anjaani (2010). She has stated that it was Salman Khan's suggestion to change her name, as Alia Bhatt was already an established actress.

Career

Early work (2014–2019)

Advani began her acting career with the Hindi ensemble comedy film Fugly (2014). Taran Adarsh of Bollywood Hungama wrote, "Kiara Advani catches you completely unaware" and has the "combination of looks and talent". Mehul S Thakkar of Deccan Chronicle found her "very striking" and said that she "shows a lot of promise". Fugly underperformed at the box office.
 Two years later, Advani appeared in the sports drama M.S. Dhoni: The Untold Story (2016), a biopic of cricketer MS Dhoni who served as the former captain of Indian cricket team. She had a supporting role opposite Sushant Singh Rajput (who essayed Dhoni), as the real-life character of his wife, hotel manager Sakshi Rawat.

Advani then starred in Abbas–Mustan's action thriller Machine (2017). It failed at the box office. She next collaborated with filmmaker Karan Johar, for their first of many films, in the Netflix anthological film Lust Stories (2018), where she starred opposite Vicky Kaushal as his sexually dissatisfied wife. Writing for NDTV, Raja Sen found her to be "positively lovely" in it. She also featured with Shahid Kapoor in the music video "Urvashi", sung by Yo Yo Honey Singh.

Advani expanded to Telugu cinema in 2018, appearing with Mahesh Babu in the action film Bharat Ane Nenu from Koratala Siva, about a student who unexpectedly becomes the chief minister of Andhra Pradesh. Janani K of India Today opined that she "shines in her brief role" but added that her character was "more of an eye-candy who doesn't add any purpose to the story". The film grossed  worldwide, making it one of Telugu cinema's highest grossers. She, however, failed to replicate this success with her second Telugu film, Vinaya Vidheya Rama, co-starring Ram Charan. In a scathing review for The Hindu, Sangeetha Devi Dundoo wrote, "It isn't Kiara Advani's fault that she looks lost in the melee." In the same year, she had a guest appearance in Abhishek Varman's ensemble period film Kalank, produced by Johar.

Rise to prominence (2019–present) 

Advani received wider attention later in 2019 for Sandeep Reddy Vanga's romantic drama Kabir Singh, starring Shahid Kapoor. The film had a worldwide gross of over  becoming her highest-grossing release, but critics panned it due to its depiction of misogyny and toxic masculinity. Rajeev Masand bemoaned that her passive character "offers the actress little to work with". She then starred in the comedy Good Newwz alongside Akshay Kumar, Kareena Kapoor Khan and Diljit Dosanjh, about two couples tryst with in vitro fertilization. Namrata Joshi opined, "Dosanjh and Advani are all about the amplification of the boisterous, kitschy Punjabi stereotype but they play it with an infectious cheer." Both Kabir Singh and Good Newwz grossed over  each domestically, ranking among the year's highest-grossing films. She won the IIFA Award for Best Supporting Actress for her performance in Good Newwz.

In 2020, Advani starred in Johar's production Guilty, a Netflix film about sexual assault. Ektaa Malik of The Indian Express believed that she had been "reduced to the 'tortured-artistic-creative' types" She then played the wife of Akshay Kumar's character in Raghava Lawrence's horror comedy Laxmii, in which Kumar's character gets possessed by a transgender ghost. Laxmii was released digitally on Disney+ Hotstar owing to the COVID-19 pandemic, and met with negative reviews. Even so, it attained a strong viewership on the platform. In her final release of 2020, Advani starred in the unremarkable romantic comedy Indoo Ki Jawani (2020).

Advani next featured in the war film Shershaah (2021), based on the life of army officer Vikram Batra (played by Sidharth Malhotra), in which she played Batra's girlfriend. The film released digitally on Amazon Prime Video, on which it became the most-streamed Indian film. Anna M. M. Vetticad of Firstpost opined that Advani "sparkles" in her brief role. She received a nomination for the Filmfare Award for Best Actress.

The following year, she appeared with Kartik Aaryan and Tabu in the comedy horror film Bhool Bhulaiyaa 2. Shalini Langer of The Indian Express wrote that she "has little to do except pop up now and then". Advani starred alongside an ensemble cast in Jugjugg Jeeyo, a comedy-drama about divorce, in which Varun Dhawan and her played an unhappily married couple. Writing for Hindustan Times, Monika Rawal Kukreja commended her "restrained performance" in it. It earned  worldwide. She then starred in the comic thriller Govinda Naam Mera, with Vicky Kaushal and Bhumi Pednekar, which released digitally on Disney+ Hotstar. Sukanya Verma of Rediff.com opined that "Kiara Advani's energy is capable of far more heavy lifting than it gets credit for."

Advani will next appear in an untitled Telugu film directed by S. Shankar, co-starring Ram Charan. She will also reunite with Kartik Aaryan in the romantic drama Satyaprem Ki Katha.

Personal life and media image

Despite persistent rumours of dating actor Sidharth Malhotra since 2020, Advani did not publicly speak about the relationship. On 7 February 2023, they married in Jaisalmer, Rajasthan in a traditional Hindu wedding ceremony. Their wedding received widespread media attention, resulting in their official wedding pictures being the most liked Instagram post in India till date.

In 2019, Advani took part of the campaign as brand ambassador for Giordano handbags. In 2020, Advani collaborated with Myntra. In 2022, she took part with Mango in India in a campaign with endorse the brand's Spring-Summer-22 collection. In 2023, Advani became the new face of the mango drink brand, Slice.

Advani ranked 30th in GQ Indias listing of the 30 most influential young Indians. She is frequently featured in The Times of India listing of the "Most Desirable Woman"; she ranked sixth in 2019 and fourth in 2020. In March 2023, Advani performed at the opening ceremony of the Women's Premier League.

Filmography

Films 

All films are in Hindi unless otherwise noted.

Web series

Music videos

Accolades

References

External links 
 
 

1991 births
Living people
Indian film actresses
Sindhi people
Actresses in Hindi cinema
Actresses in Telugu cinema
Indian people of Spanish descent
Indian people of Portuguese descent
Indian people of Irish descent
Indian people of Scottish descent
International Indian Film Academy Awards winners
Zee Cine Awards Telugu winners